Sethunathasarma Krishnaswami (1945–2015), popularly known as Swami,  was an Indian geochemist and an honorary scientist at the geosciences division of the Physical Research Laboratory. He was known for his studies on low temperature geochemistry and was an elected fellow of the Indian Academy of Sciences, Indian National Science Academy, The World Academy of Sciences, National Academy of Sciences, India, American Geophysical Union, Geochemical Society and European Association of Geochemistry (2003). The Council of Scientific and Industrial Research, the apex agency of the Government of India for scientific research, awarded him the Shanti Swarup Bhatnagar Prize for Science and Technology, one of the highest Indian science awards for his contributions to Earth, atmosphere, ocean and planetary Sciences in 1984.

Biography 

Krishnaswami, born on 21 May 1945 in Thiruvananthapuram, in the south Indian state of Kerala, did his graduate studies in science at the University College, Thiruvananthapuram of the University of Kerala and on completion of the degree in 1963, he joined Bhabha Atomic Research Centre Training School for a short term training. Subsequently, he joined the geophysics group of Tata Institute of Fundamental Research as a research associate in 1964 where he stayed till 1972. Simultaneously, he enrolled in Bombay University and secured a PhD in 1974, working under the guidance of Devendra Lal. His post-doctoral researches were at Scripps Institution of Oceanography with Harmon Craig and at the laboratory of K. K. Turekian of Yale University. By this time, he had already moved to Physical Research Laboratory (PRL), Ahmedabad in 1973 and on returning to India, he spent the rest of his career there, superannuating from service in 2005. He held various positions during his tenure at PRL such as that of a dean from 1987 to 1993 and acting director during 2004–05 and continued his association with the laboratory post-retirement as an Indian National Science Academy scientist and honorary professor. He also served as a visiting scientist at Scripps Institute of Oceanography (1971–72) and as a visiting faculty at the Department of Geology and Geophysics of Yale University for two stints during 1976–77 and 1986–87.

Krishnaswami died on 20 July 2015 at the age of 70, survived by his wife, son and daughter.

Legacy 

During his post-doctoral days at Scripps Institution of Oceanography, Krishnaswami assisted Harmon Craig in his discovery of 210Pb-226Ra radioactive disequilibrium in the deep sea and his association with K. K. Turekian at Yale University helped develop U-Th series nuclide applications in aquatic systems which has been detailed in a book, U-Th Series Nuclides in Aquatic Systems, co-edited by him and published by Elsevier Science in 2008. His researches are known to have established the accretion rate and growth history of ocean-floor ferromanganese nodules which he estimated by radionuclide method and the work assisted in the determination of the history of sedimentation in Indian lakes and coastal regions. He applied these methods in estimating the weathering and erosion in the Himalaya and Deccan Traps and for assessing their influence on global change. He was also involved in geochemical studies on the rivers of Ganges and Brahmaputra for assessing the evolution of strontium isotopes and uranium concentration in the ocean since the Cenozoic era. His studies have been detailed in over 100 peer reviewed articles; the online article repository of the Indian Academy of Sciences has listed several of them. He served as the vice president of International Association for the Physical Sciences of the Oceans (2003–07) and Scientific Committee on Oceanic Research of the International Council for Science (1994–96), as the treasurer of the International Geosphere-Biosphere Programme, and as a member of the council of the Indian National Science Academy (2002–04). He was also associated with Geochimica et Cosmochimica Acta and Journal of Earth System Science as a member of their editorial boards and mentored 6 doctoral scholars in their studies.

Awards and honors 
Krishnaswami received the Young Scientist Medal of the Indian National Science Academy in 1975 and Krishnan Medal of the Indian Geophysical Union in 1981. The Council of Scientific and Industrial Research awarded him the Shanti Swarup Bhatnagar Prize for Science and Technology, one of the highest Indian science awards, in 1984. He was an elected fellow of all the three major Indian science academies; the Indian Academy of Sciences elected him as a fellow in 1986, followed by Indian National Science Academy in 1989 and the National Academy of Sciences, India in 1992. He became a fellow of The World Academy of Sciences with his election in 2000. He was also a fellow of the American Geophysical Union, Geochemical Society and European Association of Geochemistry (2003).

Selected bibliography

Books

Articles 
 
 
 
 
 
 Tripathy, Gyana R.; Singh, Sunil K.; Krishnaswami, S. (2011). "Sr and Nd isotopes as tracers of chemical and physical erosion". In: Handbook of Environmental Isotope Geochemistry (Ed: M. Baskaran), Advances in Isotope Geochemistry, 521-552, DOI: 10.1007/978-3-642-10637-8_26.

See also 
 Devendra Lal
 Harmon Craig

Notes

References

External links

Further reading 
 

Recipients of the Shanti Swarup Bhatnagar Award in Earth, Atmosphere, Ocean & Planetary Sciences
1945 births
Indian scientific authors
Fellows of the Indian Academy of Sciences
Fellows of the Indian National Science Academy
Fellows of The National Academy of Sciences, India
TWAS fellows
2015 deaths
Scientists from Thiruvananthapuram
Malayali people
University College Thiruvananthapuram alumni
Tata Institute of Fundamental Research alumni
Scripps Institution of Oceanography alumni
Yale University alumni
Scripps Institution of Oceanography faculty
Yale University faculty
Fellows of the American Geophysical Union
Indian geochemists
20th-century Indian chemists
20th-century Indian earth scientists